The S2 is a railway service of the St. Gallen S-Bahn that provides hourly service between  and , in the Swiss canton of St. Gallen. THURBO, a joint venture of Swiss Federal Railways and the canton of Thurgau, operates the service.

Operations 

Route 

  –  –  –  –  – 

 Nesslau-Neu St. Johann
 
 
 Wattwil
 
  (stops only on request)
  (stops only on request)
 
  (stops only on request)
 Herisau
 
 St. Gallen
 
 
 
 
 Rorschach
 
 
 
 
 
 
 Altstätten SG

History 
Until the December 2018 timetable change, the S2's westbound terminus was St. Gallen. Service from St. Gallen to Nesslau-Neu St. Johann had been provided by the S8. Scheduling issues with the S8 prompted a swap, with the S2 taking over the S8's former schedule west of St. Gallen.

References

External links 

 Fahrplan Ost

St. Gallen S-Bahn lines
Transport in the canton of St. Gallen